Bridge in Rockdale Township is a historic metal truss bridge spanning French Creek at Rockdale Township, Crawford County, Pennsylvania. It was built by the Wrought Iron Bridge Company of Canton, Ohio.

It was added to the National Register of Historic Places in 1988.

References

Road bridges on the National Register of Historic Places in Pennsylvania
Bridges completed in 1887
Bridges in Crawford County, Pennsylvania
National Register of Historic Places in Crawford County, Pennsylvania
Wrought iron bridges in the United States
Pratt truss bridges in the United States